Some Day Soon is the debut and only solo album by singer-songwriter Kristian Leontiou. He subsequently formed a band, One Eskimo. The album was originally released on 31 May 2004 and then re-released on 4 April 2005 with new artwork and bonus track "Fast Car" - a single and cover version of Tracy Chapman's song, that Leontiou had previously played at different venues and had proved to be a favourite amongst fans.

Reception
Caroline Sullivan of The Guardian gave the album three stars out of five, saying that a "soulful, lover-man tenor, which was made for sweaty R&B action" had been "squandered on middle-of-the-road ballads", but concluding that "Leontiou's saving grace is a depressive edge that roughs up even the blandest tracks".

Track listing
"Story of My Life" (Kristian Leontiou, Sarah Erasmus, Pete Wilkinson) – 3:49
"Shining" (Leontiou, Erasmus, Wilkinson) – 4:01
"The Years Move On" (Leontiou, Erasmus, Wilkinson) – 3:54
"Fast Car"1 (Tracy Chapman) – 3:18
"Love Is All I Need" (Leontiou, Erasmus, Wilkinson) – 3:41
"It's OK" (Wilkinson) – 4:02
"The Crying" (Leontiou, Erasmus, Wilkinson) – 3:26
"Some Say" (Leontiou, Erasmus, Wilkinson) – 3:35
"Caught In The Moment" (Leontiou, Erasmus, Wilkinson) – 3:50
"Hanging" (Leontiou, Matty Benbrook, Pauline Taylor) – 3:51
"Fall And I Will Catch You" (Leontiou, Erasmus, Wilkinson) – 4:02
"Sometimes I Wonder" (Acoustic Version)2 (Leontiou, Mark Stevens, Alan Ross) – 3:28
"Remember The Day"3 (Leontiou) – 1:00

1 Added on album re-release
2 UK bonus track
3 Snippet, hidden track

Singles
"Story of My Life"
Released: 24 May 2004
Chart positions: #9(UK), #70(DE)
B-side: "Homecoming"

"Shining"
Released: 16 August 2004
Chart positions: #13(UK)
B-side: "Here I Am"

"Some Say"
Released: 22 November 2004
Chart positions: #54(UK)
B-side: "Hi-lo & In Between"

Murder victim Meredith Kercher made a cameo appearance in the music video. Her performance came three years before she was found dead in Italy.

"Fast Car" (Download only)
Released: 4 April 2005
Chart positions: #88 (UK - 2011)
B-side: "About Last Night"

Release history

References

2004 debut albums
Polydor Records albums